Michael Boyce may refer to:

Michael Boyce, Baron Boyce (born 1943), former First Sea Lord of the Royal Navy and Chief of Defence Staff
Michael Boyce (field hockey) (born 1980), Australian field hockey player